Ust-Khayryuzovo is a rural settlement located in Tigilsky District, Koryak Okrug, Kamchatka Krai, Russia. It is located at the mouth of the Khayryuzovo River, which is its namesake.

Geography 
Ust-Khayryuzovo is located on the western coast of the Kamchatka Peninsula, on the Sea of Okhotsk. It is located approximately 466km from Petropavlovsk-Kamchatsky, and approximately 6,349km from Moscow.

Government 
The government is made up of the head (Aleksandr Aleksandrovich Torin), and the council of deputies. All elected official serve four year terms.

Climate 
The climate of Ust-Khayryuzovo is subarctic, or Dsc under the Köppen climate classification.

References

Rural localities in Kamchatka Krai